Kaalam  is a 1981 Indian Tamil-language film, starring K. R. Vijaya, Raveendran, and Menaka.

Cast
K. R. Vijaya
Raveendran
Menaka
Jayamalini

Soundtrack

Reception

References

1980 films
1981 films
1980s Tamil-language films
Films scored by Shankar–Ganesh